Shakeout is a term used in business and economics to describe the consolidation of an industry or sector, in which businesses are eliminated or acquired through competition. It may also refer to a situation in which many investors exit their positions, often at a loss, due to uncertainty in the market or recent bad news circulating around a particular security or industry.

Shakeouts can often occur after an industry has experienced a period of rapid growth in demand followed by overexpansion by manufacturers. Large, diversified companies are often most able to endure a weak business climate and can benefit from shakeouts. A shakeout of investors and internet businesses occurred during the dot-com bubble.

References

Mergers and acquisitions